Robert Blythe may refer to:

 Robert Blythe (actor) (1947–2018), British actor
 Sandy Blythe (Robert Alexander "Sandy" Blythe, 1962–2005), Australian wheelchair basketball player
 Robert Blythe (mayor), American politician, mayor of Richmond, Kentucky

See also
Robert Blyth (disambiguation)
Bob Blyth (1869–1941), Scottish football manager